Jordan Jelev (born 14 June 1975), known also as The Labelmaker, is a Bulgarian graphic and typeface designer, and calligrapher.

Biography

Early years
Jelev was born on 14 June 1975 in Varna, Bulgaria. His affiliation to visual arts dates back to the age of 12 when he created his first hand-made signs embroidered on jeans. Later at the end of his study at Varna High-school of Math, he discovered his love for calligraphy and custom lettering which influenced significantly his work as graphic designer.

Professional career
In 1996, he started his education at Varna University of Economics. Right at the same time he began working as graphic designer in Zograph Studio. In 1998 he moved to Factor R studio in Varna where he started his career as dedicated wine label designer. Since that time he had successfully designed a considerable amount of premium brands – most of them later recognized as some of the icons of Bulgarian Wine and Spirits industry.

In 2003, he started making professional photography for wine and spirits industry. In 2005 he did his first solo exhibition with macro and abstract photography in Varna.

Since 2010, he started working for different wineries in Barossa Valley - Australia, Napa Valley - USA, Fair Haven, NY - USA, Languedoc - France, FYRO Macedonia, Lombardy - Italy, Rheinhessen - Germany etc. His work was featured by some of the world's famous design blogs like Packaging of the Word, Lovelypackage, The Dieline, World Packaging Design etc.

As author of Bulgarian wine label designs, Jelev received "the Labelmaker" nickname which eventually turned into his own signature and personal brand.

Awards
2001, Stalker Award
2009, 1st Prize for wine label designs / National Vine and Wine chamber of Bulgaria 
2011, Best Wine Label award / Vinaria Wine Expo
2012, Gold Medal for Best wine label for Stallion Red Wine / San Francisco International Wine Competition
2013, Bronze Medal for Best wine label for White Stallion Wine / San Francisco International Wine Competition   
2013, Stalker Award
2014, Gold Medal for Best Wine Label Design at BIWC for Salty Hills wines  
2015, Double Gold Packaging Award for Colloca Estate 2013 Riesling at the 2015 Fingerlakes International Wine Competition  
2016, Silver Medal, Packaging Design – Color & Type for PIXELS, Rose at Los Angeles International Wine Competition
2016, Gold Medal, Packaging Design – Contemporary for PIXELS, Sauvignon Blanc at Los Angeles International Wine Competition  
2017, 2nd Prize for Best Wine Label Design at Rose Wine Expo, Kazanlak for Golden Rhythm Rose by Black Sea Gold, Pomorie 
2017, 1st Prize for Best Wine Label Design at Rose Wine Expo, Kazanlak for Orbelia Rose by Orbelia Winery 
2017, Grand Prix for Best Wine Label Design at Rose Wine Expo, Kazanlak for SOULMATEs wines by Stratsin Winery  
2017, Gold Medal for Best Wine Label Design at BIWC for SOULMATEs wines

References

External links
Official website

1975 births
Living people
Bulgarian graphic designers
Bulgarian calligraphers
Artists from Varna, Bulgaria
21st-century Bulgarian artists